Sondrio (archaic  or) is an Italian city and comune and Provincial Capital located in the heart of the Valtellina. , Sondrio counts approximately 21,876 inhabitants (2015) and it is the administrative centre for the province of Sondrio. In 2007, Sondrio was given the Alpine Town of the Year award.

History 

Formerly an Ancient Roman military camp, today's Sondrio was founded by the Lombards: in their language Sundrium meant "Exclusive property", referring to the status of free men (arimanni) of the holders of the city and the surrounding land.

After the fall of the Lombard Kingdom in Italy, Sondrio became part of the Holy Roman Empire. The Capitanei of Vizzola, who controlled much of the Valtellina, had it in 1040 from the emperor Henry II. From 1310 to 1335 the city was involved in the war between the Guelph and Ghibelline factions of the nearby Como, and its war against Milan. After having resisted several attacks by the Comaschi, in 1335 Sondrio and Valtellina became part of the Visconti Milanese dominions.

From the second half of the 16th century to the end of the 18th century, Sondrio was governed by the Tre Leghe Grigie ("Three Grey Leagues") of the Grisons, as the capital city of Valtellina. After the Reformation, Sondrio was the centre of heavy struggles between the Catholic Valtellinesi and the Protestant Grisons. In 1620 the citizens, led by Giacomo Robustelli, killed 180 Protestants and declared the independence of the Valtellina.

After the Napoleonic parenthesis, in which it became part of the Cisalpine Republic (later Kingdom of Italy), Sondrio with the Valtellina was annexed to the Austrian Kingdom of Lombardy–Venetia, and fought gallantly for its independence.

Geography 
The town is located in the middle of the province, and borders with the municipalities of Albosaggia, Caiolo, Castione Andevenno, Faedo Valtellino, Montagna in Valtellina, Spriana and Torre di Santa Maria. Its hamlets (frazioni) are Arquino, Colda, Gualtieri, Ligari, Moroni, Mossini, Ponchiera, Sant'Anna, Sassella, Triangia and Triasso.

Government

Economy 

The territory of Sondrio has numerous vineyards; wines produced include the Sassella and Grumello. Wine represents one of the main resources of this region, together with tourism, especially in winter.

Another important piece of Sondrio's economy is its banking industry, with the Banca Popolare di Sondrio and the Credito Valtellinese both headquartered in Sondrio and listed on the Milan Stock Exchange.

Main sights 
The heart of Sondrio is its central Garibaldi Square. Not far from it is the Palazzo Sassi, home of the Art and History Museum of Valtellina. In a dominant position, near the ancient road to the Valmalenco, linking the town to Switzerland, stands the Masegra Castle, housing the Historical Museum of the Grisons Domination.

The church of Santi Gervasio e Protasio rebuilt in Neoclassical-style in 1838, was built in the 12th century as a Romanesque pieve and collegiate church. Other sights include the Torre Ligariana, once the collegiate's bell tower, and the Palazzo Pretorio, once the seat of the Grisons government.

Across the railway in direction of Milan there is the ancient Church of Maria della Sassella, which the local tradition dates back to the 10th century. In March 2021 the Roman Catholic Diocese of Como declared the church to be a diocesan Marian sanctuary.

People 
 Giovanni Pietro Ligario (1686–1748), painter
 Antonio Caimi (1814–1878), painter
 Enrico Sertoli (1842–1910), physiologist and histologist
 Antonio Carini (1872–1950), physician, bacteriologist and professor
 Primo H. Zopatti (1878-1934), entrepreneur America, Zopatti Bros., Dorchester.
 Pier Luigi Nervi (1891–1979), engineer
 Valerio Ricetti (1898—1952), Italian-Australian hermit                                                                                 
 Gianni Celati (b. 1937), writer, translator and literary critic
 Sophia Zopatti Lewis (b.1941), Olympic dressage hunter/jumper Rome 1960
 Giulio Tremonti (b. 1947), politician
 Benedetto Della Vedova (b. 1962), politician
 Raffaella "Raffy" Rossi (b. 1974), ski mountaineer and skyrunner
 Luca Colombo (b. 1984), football player
 Matteo D'Alessandro (b. 1989), football player
 Robert Antonioli (b. 1990), ski mountaineer
 Michele Boscacci (b. 1990), ski mountaineer
 Arianna Fontana (b. 1990), short track speed skater
 Lorenzo Passerini (b. 1991), conductor

Twin towns – sister cities

Sondrio is twinned with:
 Radovljica, Slovenia
 São Mateus, Brazil
 Sindelfingen, Germany

Sports
Sondrio Calcio is the football club of the city and currently plays in Serie D.

See also 

 Sondrio railway station

References

External links 

 Official website 
Sondrio tourist website
 Sondrio weather website

 
Cities and towns in Lombardy